The Bishan rubber-tyred tram, or Bishan SkyShuttle, is an elevated rubber-tyred metro line in Bishan District, Chongqing, China. It runs from north to south, starting at Bishan station on Line 1 of Chongqing Rail Transit, and finishing at Bishan railway station, on the Chengdu–Chongqing intercity railway.

History
Construction began on 22 February 2019. The line opened on 16 April 2021.

Stations

Technology
BYD's SkyShuttle system is used. This line is the first SkyShuttle installation to open to the public. It should not be confused with another product (SkyRail) of BYD Company which is monorail.

References

2021 establishments in China
Rubber-tyred metros
Rail transport in Chongqing